May Lee (born March 28, 1966) was the host of STAR TV's The May Lee Show when she was based in Singapore. A second generation Korean American, Lee faced gender discrimination and anti-Asian bias early in her career, and spent the 1980s moving between local broadcasters. However, she reached a turning point in 1995, when she joined CNN; she first worked as a correspondent in Tokyo and Hong Kong, and later became the network's first female anchor of Korean descent.

Following her success at CNN, Lee returned to the United States in 1999, where she hosted the talk show Pure Oxygen on The Oxygen Network, and also worked for other major broadcasters including ABC and NBC.

In 2004, Lee returned to the Asia-Pacific region as an anchor for The Wall Street Journal Asia, CNBC's Asian financial news program, and then co-anchored CNBC Tonight with Teymoor Nabili until December 2005. Though she initially worried that as she aged, her career opportunities would decrease, she stated that her popular reception had improved due to her "experience and flexibility".

In 2007, inspired by the economic and social changes she had seen in her five years away from Asia, she launched The May Lee Show, an English-language talk show modelled on The Oprah Winfrey Show and aimed specifically at Asian women. STAR TV placed great importance on the promotion of the new show, giving it a prime time slot right after the semi-final of American Idol, before moving it to the Sunday 8 P.M. slot two weeks later. The program discusses both soft issues such as fashion and celebrities, as well as social problems such as divorce, infidelity, and child trafficking; guests on the first episode included American actress Joan Chen, Australian singer Olivia Newton-John, and New Zealand chef Bobby Chinn.

Lee was appointed the LA-based correspondent for CGTN-America in December 2014. In early 2020, Lee launched her vodcast (video-podcast) "The May Lee Show", a production of her company, Lotus Media House. The show focuses on AAPI people, issues and trends. But COVID-19 and the rise of anti-Asian hate motivated Lee to use her platform to speak up about and speak out on Asian xenophobia and the historic reasons behind it. Because of her efforts to bring attention to the crisis, Lee labeled herself an "Accidental Activist". In July 2020, Forbes recognized Lee as one of "50 Over 50" women making an impact on the world. 

Lee is also an adjunct professor at the USC Annenberg School of Communication and Journalism where she teaches traditional and multimedia journalism for both undergraduate and graduate programs. She spearheaded a new course for Annenberg, "Asian American History and Journalism", which debuted Fall of 2021. The first of its kind course at Annenberg, Lee was compelled to develop curriculum that addressed the lack of AAPI history in order to build better understanding and awareness. 

Lee is author of "May Lee, Live and in Person" and she's working on an academic publication that will be released in 2022.

References

American expatriates in Hong Kong
American expatriates in Japan
American women television journalists
American people of Korean descent
1966 births
Living people